The Lent Bumps 2005 were a series of rowing races held at Cambridge University from Tuesday 1 March to Saturday 5 March 2005. The event was run as a bumps race and was one of the series of Lent Bumps which have been held annually in late February or early March since 1887. See Lent Bumps for the format of the races. In 2005, a total of 121 crews took part (69 men's crews and 52 women's crews), with nearly 1100 participants.

Head of the River crews
 Caius men rowed-over in 1st position, retaining the headship for the 4th consecutive year.

 Downing women rowed-over in 1st position for the 2nd year in a row, their first successful defence over the headship.

Highest 2nd VIIIs
 The highest men's 2nd VIII for the 6th consecutive year was Caius II, despite losing their place in the 1st division to King's.

 The highest women's 2nd VIII for the 5th consecutive year was Jesus II.

Links to races in other years

Bumps Charts
Below are the bumps charts for all 4 men's and all 3 women's divisions, with the men's event on the left and women's event on the right. The bumps chart represents the progress of every crew over all four days of the racing. To follow the progress of any particular crew, simply find the crew's name on the left side of the chart and follow the line to the end-of-the-week finishing position on the right of the chart.

Note that this chart may not be displayed correctly if you are using a large font size on your browser.

References
CUCBC – the organisation that runs the bumps
First and Third Trinity Boat Club
Cambridge University Radio (CUR1350) downloadable MP3s of race commentary

Lent Bumps results
2005 in rowing
2005 in English sport